Nikolai Andreev (born 5 February 1975 in Saratov, Russia) is a Russian mathematician and popularizer of mathematics. He was awarded with the Leelavati Award in 2022.

Biography 
Nikolai is the Head of the Laboratory for Popularization and Promotion of Mathematics at the Steklov Mathematical Institute of the Russian Academy of Sciences (Moscow). He received a Ph.D. in mathematics from Moscow State University in 2000. Among his many highly valued projects by the Russian mathematical community is the creation of the online resource Mathematical Etudes.

Awards and honours 
 Prize of the President of the Russian Federation in the Area of Sciences and Innovations for Young Scientists (2010)
 Gold Medal of the Russian Academy of Sciences (2017) for outstanding achievements in science popularization
 The Leelavati Award in 2022 for his contribution to the art of mathematical animation and mathematical model building, in a style that inspires young and old alike, and that mathematicians around the world can adapt to its many uses, as well as for his tireless efforts to popularize genuine mathematics among the public through videos, lectures, and an award-winning book

References 

Russian mathematicians
Living people
1975 births